Katerina Izmailova (born June 10, 1977) is a 3-time Olympic freestyle swimmer from Tajikistan. She competed for Tajikistan at the 2000, 2008 Olympics and 2012 Olympics.

References

External links

Living people
1977 births
Sportspeople from Dushanbe
Swimmers at the 2000 Summer Olympics
Swimmers at the 2008 Summer Olympics
Swimmers at the 2012 Summer Olympics
Tajikistani female freestyle swimmers
Olympic swimmers of Tajikistan
Tajikistani people of Russian descent